Statistics of the Primera División de México for the 1958–59 season.

Overview

Celaya was promoted to Primera División.

The season was contested by 14 teams, and Guadalajara won the championship.

Cuautla was relegated to Segunda División.

Guadalajara qualified to the 1959 Campeonato Centroamericano.

Teams

League standings

Results

References

Mexico - List of final tables (RSSSF)

1958-59
Mex
1958–59 in Mexican football